KKCR-FM Kauai Community Radio (90.9 FM) is a community radio station broadcasting a variety format including  Hawaiian, jazz, blues, R&B, rock, reggae, classical and world artists as well as locally produced talk programs. Licensed to the Kekahu Foundation in Hanalei, Hawaii, United States, the station serves the island of Kauai and parts of Oahu.  The station is owned by the Kekahu Foundation, Inc.

The idea for KKCR originated in the late '80s. Janet Friend, Roy Richardson, Richard Fernandez, Jon and Lorraine Scott, and other Island residents decided to start a radio station that would serve Island residents, withstand extreme weather conditions and provide emergency information to isolated residents.  The station provides one of the primary Emergency Alert System signals on Kauai.

Repeaters

Translators and boosters

KKCR also broadcasts on radio station KAQA 91.9 MHz Kauai, KAQA's FM booster 92.7 MHz via translator K224CQ in Anahola, Hawaii and 88.9 MHz via translator K205FM in Honolulu, Hawaii.

See also
List of community radio stations in the United States

References

External links
 
 
 
 

 
 
 
 
 

KCR
Community radio stations in the United States